Thebes railway station is the main railway station of Thebes in Boeotia, Greece. Located 900 m from the center of Thebes, The station is served by Intercity trains between Athens and Thessaloniki.

History
The station was opened on 8 March 1904.  In 1970 OSE became the legal successor to the SEK, taking over responsibilities for most of Greece's rail infrastructure.

In 2001 the infrastructure element of OSE was created, known as GAIAOSE; it would henceforth be responsible for the maintenance of stations, bridges and other elements of the network, as well as the leasing and the sale of railway assists. In 2005, TrainOSE was created as a brand within OSE to concentrate on rail services and passenger interface.

In 2009, with the Greek debt crisis unfolding OSE's Management was forced to reduce services across the network. Timetables were cut back and routes closed, as the government-run entity attempted to reduce overheads. In 2017 OSE's passenger transport sector was privatised as TrainOSE, currently a wholly-owned subsidiary of Ferrovie dello Stato Italiane infrastructure, including stations, remained under the control of OSE.

In July 2022, the station began being served by Hellenic Train, the rebranded TranOSE

Facilities
The ground-level station is located via stairs or a ramp. It has 5 island platforms, with the main station buildings located on the southbound platform. As of (2021) the station has waiting shelters on the platforms and a staffed booking office, As well as is a baggage claim in the adjoining building. The station has a buffet. At platform level, there are sheltered seating, Dot-matrix display departure or arrival screens and timetable poster boards on all the platforms. There are currently no lifts, however, stairs are available to both used raised Island platform's. The station is equipped with a small car park, taxi rank, and bus stop on the forecourt at the entrance to the station.

Services
It is served by Regional, Express and Intercity services between Athens, Kalambaka, Leianokladi and Thessaloniki. The station sees around 16 trains per-day.

Line layout

References

Transport in Boeotia
Railway stations in Central Greece
Railway stations opened in 1904
Buildings and structures in Boeotia